The little D IV was one of the most frequently seen tank locomotives in the stations of the Royal Bavarian State Railways (Königlich Bayerische Staatsbahn). The Deutsche Reichsbahn took over almost all of them, 124 in total, of which  24 were from the Palatinate (Pfalz).

See also 
 Royal Bavarian State Railways
 List of Bavarian locomotives and railbuses

References

0-4-0T locomotives
D 04
Standard gauge locomotives of Germany
Krauss locomotives
Maffei locomotives
Railway locomotives introduced in 1878
B n2t locomotives

Shunting locomotives